The historic building at 197–199 Yonge Street was formerly a four-floor Canadian Bank of Commerce building built in 1905 by architects Darling and Pearson and declared as a historical property by the City of Toronto, Ontario, Canada in 1974. The bank left the building in 1987. The bank address was 199 Yonge Street, the numbers still showing above the entrance. Next door at 205 Yonge Street is another historic site. The gap between the two sites was once the Colonial Tavern, demolished in the 20th century.

References

External links
 Heritage Property Detail: 197 Yonge Street
 Canadian Bank of Commerce

Buildings and structures in Toronto
Darling and Pearson buildings
Neoclassical architecture in Canada
Historic bank buildings in Canada
Commercial buildings completed in 1905
1905 establishments in Ontario